DAB (Dansk Almennyttigt Boligselskab) is a Danish non-profit public housing authority founded in 1942. It administers properties in 18 Danish municipalities, and is one of the largest public housing bodies in the country.

External links
 Official site

Housing in Denmark